CBRE can refer to

 Canadian Brotherhood of Railway Employees, a railway trade union in Canada.
 Chemical, Biological, Radiological and Explosive Defence Group, a counter-terrorism unit in Singapore.
 CBRE Group, a multinational real estate corporation.
 Certified Broadcast Radio Engineer, a professional title regulated by The Society of Broadcast Engineers.